Tammy Blanchard (born December 14, 1976) is an American actress. She rose to prominence for her role as teenage Judy Garland in the critically acclaimed television film Life with Judy Garland: Me and My Shadows (2001), for which she received a Golden Globe Award nomination and a Primetime Emmy Award. Her other notable film roles were in The Good Shepherd (2006), Sybil (2007), Into the Woods (2014) and The Invitation (2015).

Blanchard has been nominated for two Tony Awards: one for her role as Louise in the 2003 Broadway revival of the musical Gypsy, and the other as Hedy LaRue in the 2011 Broadway revival of the musical How to Succeed in Business Without Really Trying.

Career
She made her professional acting debut on the soap opera Guiding Light in 1997, where she played spoiled rich girl Drew Jacobs. Her first scene was with Taye Diggs, who briefly played a record producer on the show. The character of Drew became more prominent over the years, and by the time of her departure in 2000, had become an audience favorite.

Soon after leaving GL, Blanchard was cast as the younger version of Judy Davis's Judy Garland in the 2001 ABC television docudrama Life with Judy Garland: Me and My Shadows. She received glowing reviews for her performance and earned an Emmy Award for Outstanding Supporting Actress in a Miniseries or a Movie.

She played Marianne Mulvaney in the Lifetime television film We Were the Mulvaneys (2002), and was noted for her "fragile strength" by The New York Times reviewer. In 2004, she played Sally Reid in the CBS made-for-television film When Angels Come to Town, with Peter Falk.

Blanchard earned a Tony Award nomination and a Theatre World Award for her work in her Broadway debut in the 2003 revival of the musical Gypsy, in which she played the title role opposite Bernadette Peters.

Blanchard's film roles include The Good Shepherd (2006), starring as the deaf lover of Matt Damon's character; Bella (2006), which took the top prize at the 2006 Toronto International Film Festival; and The Ramen Girl (2008) and Deadline (2009), both working with Brittany Murphy. She co-starred with Jessica Lange in the CBS television remake of the 1976 television film Sybil, in which she portrays a woman with dissociative identity disorder (DID). In 2008, she appeared in the multi-star cast of the television docudrama Living Proof as the first woman to have been treated with the breast cancer drug Herceptin.

In 2010, Blanchard played Amy Roberts, the widow of a murderer, in the made-for-television film Amish Grace, which first aired on the Lifetime Movie Network. The movie is based on the West Nickel Mines School shooting. The Huffington Post noted that "This is an amazing young actress and she deserves to get better and better roles." The Hollywood Reporter noted that Blanchard gives "a moving turn". The same year, she appeared in the film Rabbit Hole, alongside Nicole Kidman and Aaron Eckhart, as Kidman's sister.

Blanchard played the role of "office bombshell Hedy La Rue" in the Broadway revival of How to Succeed in Business Without Really Trying, which opened on March 27, 2011, and closed on May 20, 2012. For this role, Blanchard received her second Tony Award nomination for Best Featured Actress in a Musical.

Blanchard starred in the film Union Square, co-written and directed by the Sundance Film Festival's Grand Jury Award Winner, Nancy Savoca, which premiered at the Toronto International Film Festival in 2011, and was screened in New York City in July 2012. In 2014, Blanchard appeared as Florinda in director Rob Marshall's film, Into the Woods, an adaptation of the popular stage musical. In 2015, she portrayed Eden in Karyn Kusama's thriller film The Invitation, and in 2016, she appeared in the film Tallulah, which debuted on Netflix.

She appeared in the Broadway production of The Iceman Cometh as Cora, which started on March 23, 2018, and she played Audrey in the Off Broadway revival of Little Shop of Horrors, which opened at the Westside Theatre on October 17, 2019. For this performance, she received a Drama Desk Award nomination for Outstanding Actress in a Musical, and a Grammy Award nomination for Best Musical Theater Album.

Personal life
Blanchard lives in her hometown of Bayonne, New Jersey. She has a daughter, Ava Jean Blanchard (born 2007).

Filmography

Film

Television

Stage

Awards and nominations

References

External links
 
 
 
 
 Playbill.com article June 27, 2003

1976 births
20th-century American actresses
21st-century American actresses
Actors from Bayonne, New Jersey
Actresses from New Jersey
American women singers
American film actresses
American musical theatre actresses
American television actresses
Living people
Musicians from Bayonne, New Jersey
Outstanding Performance by a Supporting Actress in a Miniseries or Movie Primetime Emmy Award winners
Singers from New Jersey
Theatre World Award winners